Andrea Ferretti (born 18 September 1986) is an Italian footballer. He plays as a striker.

Biography
Ferretti joined the youth academy of Italian club Parma at the age of eight before being released in 2005. He was offered a trial at Football League Championship club Cardiff City, after being highly recommended by Manchester United manager Sir Alex Ferguson. After a successful trial and scoring a goal in a pre-season win over Scottish side Hamilton Academical, he was signed on a two-year professional contract.

In August 2006, having yet to start a game or score a goal for the Bluebirds first team, he was loaned out to Football League One club Scunthorpe United for an initial one-month period. He made our substitute appearances or Scunthorpe before returning to his parent club in early September of the same year after his loan came to an end. and heads for Spain On 12 April 2007, Ferretti parted company with Cardiff by mutual consent. His contract was due to expire in June 2007. He joined Cesena in the 2007 pre-season.

Spezia
On 4 July 2011 Ferretti was signed by Spezia in a 2-year contract.

Carpi
On 16 January 2012 Ferretti was loaned to Carpi. On 28 August 2012 Ferretti joined Carpi outright.

Grosseto
On 12 December 2013 he was signed by Grosseto.

Pavia

Trapani & FeralpiSalò
In summer 2016 Ferretti was signed by Trapani. On 5 January 2017 he was signed by Lega Pro club FeralpiSalò, wearing number 11 shirt.

Triestina
On 1 August 2019, he signed a 2-year contract with Triestina. On 17 January 2020, he was loaned by Imolese. On 5 October 2020 his Triestina contract was terminated by mutual consent.

References

External links

 
 AIC profile (data by football.it) 

1986 births
Footballers from Emilia-Romagna
Sportspeople from the Province of Reggio Emilia
Living people
Italian footballers
Association football forwards
Parma Calcio 1913 players
Cardiff City F.C. players
Scunthorpe United F.C. players
A.C. Cesena players
F.C. Pavia players
Spezia Calcio players
A.C. Carpi players
F.C. Grosseto S.S.D. players
Trapani Calcio players
FeralpiSalò players
U.S. Triestina Calcio 1918 players
Imolese Calcio 1919 players
Serie B players
Serie C players
English Football League players
Italian expatriate footballers
Expatriate footballers in Wales
Expatriate footballers in England